Wales is an emerging tourist destination, with 9.39m visitors to Conwy alone in 2018 and 8,078,900 visitors to National Trust and Wales Tourist Board destinations in 2002. As of 2017 the tourism industry in Wales has been estimated to have an annual turnover of £4.8 billion.

In 2005 tourism contributed to the economy of Wales supporting over 100,000 service-sector jobs, more than 8% of the country's workforce. The most popular activities undertaken by tourists in Wales were walking, shopping, hiking in the mountains and visiting historic attractions, museums and galleries. 970,000 overseas tourists visited Wales in 2015 spending £410m. The main countries of origin of overseas visitors were the Republic of Ireland, the United States and Germany. The majority of tourism however, is from other parts of the UK (predominantly England).

The capital, Cardiff is the most popular area in Wales for tourists, with 14.6 million visitors in 2009, which provides 26,300 jobs in the sector. In 2004, tourists spent the most money in Gwynedd, followed by Conwy and Cardiff.

During much of 2020 and well into 2021, the restrictions and lockdowns necessitated by the COVID-19 pandemic negatively affected all sectors of the economy and "tourism and hospitality suffered notable losses from the pandemic" across the UK. As of 6 April 2021, visitors from "red list" countries were still not allowed to enter unless they were UK residents. Restrictions will "likely be in place until the summer", one report predicted, with June being the most likely time for tourism from other countries to begin a rebound. On 12 April 2021, many tourist facilities were still closed in Wales but non-essential travel between Wales and England was finally permitted. Wales also allowed non-essential retail stores to open. The outdoor areas of restaurants and pubs would reopen on 26 April 2021.

Reasons
 

The varied landscape of Wales attracts tourism. There are three national parks: the Brecon Beacons National Park, the Snowdonia National Park and the Pembrokeshire Coast National Park. Popular activities in the national parks include hill walking, hiking, canoeing, mountain biking, kayaking and climbing. Wales is also becoming increasingly popular for 'extreme' sports, such as surfing, hang gliding and downhill cycling (in which Wales hosts the 'Dragon Downhill Series'). The terrain of Wales has also attracted the World Rally Championship (WRC). The Wales Rally GB is held annually. The 2005 Wales Rally GB saw the first WRC stage to be set indoors, at the Millennium Stadium.  In Cardiff, the regenerated Cardiff Bay area is one of the most popular destinations.

Wales' history and culture also attract tourists. The Museum of Welsh Life, which focuses largely on the industrial past of Wales, is currently the most popular tourist attraction in Wales, attracting over 600,000 visitors annually. The scars of the industrial revolution and Wales' industrial heritage can still be seen on parts of the Welsh landscape today. Many other places of historical interest attract large numbers of tourists: for example the many castles, such as Caernarfon Castle and Caerphilly Castle—most of them built to enable or to consolidate the English conquest of Wales, during the reign of the English king Edward I.

Another increasingly popular reason for visiting Wales, as with the rest of the United Kingdom—especially for those from North America—is genealogy, with many visitors coming to Wales to explore their family and ancestral roots. 1.8 million United States citizens are estimated to have Welsh ancestral roots, including former presidents, Abraham Lincoln and Thomas Jefferson.

History

The Wye Valley witnessed the birth of British tourism in the 18th century. The area became widely known after Observations on the River Wye by the Reverend William Gilpin was published in 1782. The first illustrated tour guide to be published in Britain, it helped travellers locate and enjoy the most picturesque places, such as Tintern Abbey. A particular attraction of the Wye Valley was its river scenery, and the many guidebooks, engravings and paintings encouraged a continuing steady stream of visitors which grew after the building of a new turnpike road up the valley in 1822 and the opening of a rail line in 1865.

However, when George Borrow wrote Wild Wales in 1862 it is clear from his descriptions that the notion of tourism in more mountainous parts of Wales hardly existed except for the most intrepid traveller. Indeed, he records that many locals regarded the mountainous and wild landscapes as monstrous and ugly rather than romantic or picturesque. However, later in the 19th century the concept of mountains and valleys as both interesting and visually pleasing landscapes developed; and North Wales in particular benefited, as towns and villages such as Betws-y-Coed developed to accommodate the increasing numbers of visitors.

The changing face of industrialisation in the North West of England and in the Midlands, with increasing pay rates and the provision of paid time off for industrial workers, allowed many people to enjoy an annual holiday for the first time. Many chose to visit seaside resorts such as Llandudno, Prestatyn and Rhyl in North Wales, Aberystwyth and Barmouth in Mid Wales and Barry, Tenby, Swansea and Penarth in South Wales, which among others were developed to respond to this trend.

Infrastructure
Wales is connected to the rest of the United Kingdom (its principal tourist market) by road, rail and domestic flights. The M4 Motorway connects South and West Wales with Southern England and London. The A55 road is the principal route linking North Wales with North West England.

There are several rail links between England and Wales, and trains run to Cardiff Central, Newport and Swansea from London Paddington, and to Cardiff Central from Portsmouth, Gloucester, Birmingham New Street, Manchester Picadilly, Nottingham and Newcastle.
Cardiff Central offers connections to the South Wales Valleys, the Vale of Glamorgan and West Wales, and Swansea offers connections to West Wales. There are direct services from London Euston and Birmingham to Holyhead via the North Wales Coast. Internally, there are services from Cardiff to Holyhead.

Cardiff Airport has domestic and some international flights. Some budget airlines operate from Cardiff to Europe, Africa and North America. Internally, there are twice daily return flights from Cardiff to Anglesey with Highland Airways. Many daily flight operate to and from other major UK cities such as Newcastle, Edinburgh, Glasgow, Aberdeen and Belfast.

The country is also connected to Ireland by car ferry services operating daily from Welsh ports, principally Holyhead. These services are frequent and usually operated by fast ferries.

See also

 List of Blue Flag Beaches of Wales
 Museums in Wales
 National parks of Wales
 List of World Heritage Sites in Wales
 Wales Coast Path
 List of castles in Wales
 List of tourist attractions in Wales

References

External links

 
 Visit Wales
 Welsh Assembly Government
 Attractions North Wales (Funded by Tourism Partnership North Wales)